Ransom is a village in LaSalle County, Illinois, United States. The population was 308 at the 2020 census, down from 384 at the 2010 census. It is part of the Ottawa Micropolitan Statistical Area. It is part of the subregion known as Streatorland.

History 
Ransom was a planned community; ads were placed in the Streator Monitor as early as 1876 calling for shopkeepers, craftsmen, and tradesmen to locate and set up shop in the area. In 1885, the village of Ransom was officially incorporated. The earliest businesses in Ransom included a hotel, saloon, doctor, carpenter, pharmacist, grocery store, cash exchange and a blacksmith. On the edge of the newly developing business district a small wooden water tower was constructed. In 1892 a fire devastated the eastern side of the business district, stymieing the village's growth and causing some business owners to close up shop forever.

After the fire, and much back and forth, the village constructed a new public waterworks with a 68 feet water tower at its center in 1896. The village flourished after the fire, eventually reaching a population peak of around 600 following World War II. On September 7, 1903 the first phone service reached Ransom, and AT&T opened a telegraph office in 1905. Between 1905–1910 the village constructed a sidewalk system. The first electric street lamps appeared on May 7, 1910 with the acquisition of a dozen electric street lamps from Illinois Valley Gas and Electric. Electricity gradually made its way into the homes of Ransom following the introduction of the street lamps.

Namesake 
The village was named for American Civil War general Thomas E. G. Ransom, who was born in Vermont but lived as a young man in Illinois.

Geography 
Ransom is located in southeastern LaSalle County at  (41.155955, -88.653178), at the center of Allen Township. Illinois Route 170 runs along the eastern border of the village, leading north  to Seneca along the Illinois River, and south  to Pontiac.

Demographics 

As of the 2020 census there were 308 people, 156 households, and 99 families residing in the village. The racial makeup of the village was 90.58% White, 1.30% African American, 0.65% Asian, 0.65% from other races, and 6.82% from two or more races. Hispanic or Latino of any race were 5.84% of the population.

There were 156 households, out of which 57.05% had children under the age of 18 living with them, 38.46% were married couples living together, 15.38% had a female householder with no husband present, and 36.54% were non-families. 27.56% of all households were made up of individuals, and 10.90% had someone living alone who was 65 years of age or older. The average household size was 2.78 and the average family size was 2.28.

The village's age distribution consisted of 27.0% under the age of 18, 4.8% from 18 to 24, 27.4% from 25 to 44, 31% from 45 to 64, and 9.9% who were 65 years of age or older. The median age was 38.1 years. For every 100 females, there were 108.8 males. For every 100 females age 18 and over, there were 96.2 males.

The median income for a household in the village was $63,750, and the median income for a family was $75,313. Males had a median income of $56,250 versus $28,036 for females. The per capita income for the village was $30,877. About 22.2% of families and 15.5% of the population were below the poverty line, including 25.0% of those under age 18 and 8.6% of those age 65 or over.

References

External links 
Village of Ransom official website

Villages in Illinois
Ottawa, IL Micropolitan Statistical Area
Villages in LaSalle County, Illinois
Populated places established in 1876
1876 establishments in Illinois